Prof William Whitehead Watts FRS HFRSE FGS FMS LLD (7 June 1860 – 30 July 1947) was a British geologist.

Life
He was born near Broseley in Shropshire, the eldest of two sons of Isaac Watts, but then a music master, and his wife, Maria Whitehead, daughter of a farmer.

He was educated at Bitterley and Shifnal Grammar Schools then went to Denstone College. He then studied Sciences at Sidney Sussex College, Cambridge, becoming a fellow in 1888–94; he gained first class honours in geology in 1881, graduated BA in 1882 and MA in 1885, and became ScD in 1909. He lectured for the Cambridge University Extension Scheme for ten years. He began to study the geology of Shropshire and his first paper on the subject was published in 1885.

He worked with Charles Lapworth on Shelve and the Corndon and taught at Mason College (which later became Birmingham University) during Lapworth's absence.

He taught geology at the University of Oxford from 1888, then in 1891 he joined the Geological Survey, working first in Ireland and then on Charnwood Forest. He taught at Mason College and Birmingham University from 1897 to 1906, when he accepted the chair of geology at the Imperial College of Science and Technology, South Kensington.  Watts served as secretary (1898–1909) and as president (1910–12) of the Geological Society.

Professor Watts was elected a Fellow of the Royal Society in 1904.

In 1910 he succeeded William Johnson Sollas as President of the Geological Society of London. He was succeeded in turn in 1912 by Aubrey Strahan.

He won the Murchison Medal (1915)  and the Wollaston Medal of the Geological Society. In 1934 he was elected an Honorary Fellow of the Royal Society of Edinburgh.

He retired in 1930 and died on 30 July 1947 aged 87.

Publications
He edited British Geological Photographs
Geology for Beginners (1898)
Shropshire, the Geography of the County (1919)
Geology of the Ancient Rocks of Charnwood Forest (1947)

Family
He married twice, firstly in 1891 to Louisa Adelaide Atchison, who died in 1894, then he married Rachel Atchison (nee Rodgers) the widowed sister-in-law of his first wife.

References

Further reading
"Professor W. W. Watts, ScD., LL.D., F.R.S." in The Denstonian; July 1927, pp. 84–86

External links
 

1860 births
1947 deaths
People educated at Denstone College
Academics of the University of Birmingham
Alumni of Sidney Sussex College, Cambridge
British geologists
British science writers
English geologists
Wollaston Medal winners
Fellows of the Royal Society
Presidents of the British Science Association
People from Broseley
Presidents of the Geologists' Association